Seok, also spelled Suk, is a rare Korean family name held by about 56,500 South Koreans, as well as an element in some Korean given names.

As a family name
The family name Seok can be written with either of two hanja, one meaning "stone", and the other meaning "ancient". The former version is the more widespread of the two. The 2000 South Korean census found 46,066 people by this name. Of these, the great majority are members of the Gyeongju Seok clan and the Chungju (also called Hongju) Seok clan. The latter had a 2000 South Korean population of 9,544. The Gyeongju Seok clan claims descent from certain of the early rulers of Silla; the first Gyeongju Seok to sit on the throne was the fourth Silla king, Talhae.

In a study by the National Institute of the Korean Language based on 2007 application data for South Korean passports, it was found that 61.3% of people with that surname spelled it in Latin letters as Seok in their passports, vs. 30.6% as Suk. Rarer alternative spellings (the remaining 8.1%) included Seog, Sok, Souk, and Sock.

People with this family name include:

Seok Joo-myung (1908–1950), Korean lepidopterist of the Japanese colonial period
Seok Cheoljoo (born 1950), South Korean painter
Suk Jong-yul (born 1968), South Korean professional golfer
Suk Min-hee (born 1968), South Korean Olympic team handball player
Jeannie Suk (born 1973), Korean American law professor
Seok Eun-mi (born 1976), South Korean Olympic table tennis player
Suk Jin-wook (born 1976), South Korean volleyball player
Suk Hyun-jun (born 1991), South Korean footballer

In given names
There are 20 hanja with the reading Seok on the South Korean government's official list of hanja which may be used in given names; common ones are shown in the table above.

People with the single-syllable given name Seok include:
Baek Seok (1912–1995), South Korean poet
Yi Seok (born 1941), descendant of the Joseon Dynasty royal family
Jo Seok (born 1983), South Korean webcomic artist
Kim Seok (born 1991), South Korean football player
Kim Seok (equestrian) (born 1992), South Korean equestrian

Names containing this syllable include:

Seok-ho
Seok-ju
Suk-won
Beom-seok
Dong-suk
Hyun-seok
Jae-suk
Ji-seok
Jong-seok
Jun-seok
Kwang-seok
Kyung-seok
Man-seok
Min-seok
Tae-suk
Yeon-seok
Yun-seok
Ho-seok
Seok-jin

See also
List of Korean family names
List of Korean given names

References

Korean-language surnames
Korean given names